Birla Mandir is a Hindu temple for Vithoba located in the vicinity of the Century Rayon Company in Shahad, Ulhasnagar taluka, Thane district, Maharashtra, India. It has also served as a shooting location for various Bollywood films like Tere Naam, Prem Granth, Suhaag  (Old), Golmaal: Fun Unlimited, etc. It is on the National Highway 61 (India) (Kalyan-Murbad-Nagar-Nanded-Adilabad) and is just 4 km from Kalyan city.

How to get there
Catch a train to Asangaon railway station(AN), Titwala railway station(TL) or Kasara railway station(N) from any station between Kalyan Junction railway station and Chhatrapati Shivaji Maharaj Terminus, and alight at Shahad railway station (Next to Kalyan Junction railway station). There are auto rickshaws available from Shahad (East) and Kalyan to Birla Mandir. Birla Mandir is very scenic & peaceful place. There is mini train for kids, in the adjacent Garden (Shivaji Udyan) which operates in evenings.

References

External links
 Documentary Film on Birla Mandir by Makshi Infotech

Hindu temples in Maharashtra